Denis John Menke (July 21, 1940 – December 1, 2020) was a professional baseball infielder and coach. He played all or parts of 13 seasons in Major League Baseball from 1962 to 1974. He played for the Milwaukee / Atlanta Braves (1962–67), Houston Astros (1968–71, 1974) and Cincinnati Reds (1972–73), all of the National League. He was elected to the National League All-Star team in 1969 and 1970.

Playing career 
Menke was born in Bancroft, Iowa and raised on a 480-acre farm in the northern part of the state. He played at St. John's High School in Bancroft, and signed with the Milwaukee Braves in 1958 for $175,000.

During his career, Menke hit 101 home runs and compiled a batting average of .250. In 1964, Menke hit 20 home runs, his single season best.  In 1970, as a Houston Astro, he compiled a .304 batting average, the only time he hit over .300 as a major leaguer. In 1969, Menke and Houston outfielder Jim Wynn hit grand slam home runs in the same inning.

Menke was a versatile player in the field. He played first, second, third base, shortstop, and five games as an outfielder. Menke compiled a career fielding percentage of .969. He played his last major league game July 10, 1974 with the Houston Astros.

Menke was one of the five Houston players who went to the Reds in a blockbuster trade between the 1971 and 1972 seasons. Along with Menke, the Reds received future Hall of Fame second baseman Joe Morgan, starting pitcher Jack Billingham, center fielder César Gerónimo and utility outfielder Ed Armbrister, while the Astros received second baseman Tommy Helms, first baseman Lee May and utility infielder Jimmy Stewart. This trade is generally regarded as being one of the most lopsided in the history of Major League Baseball, as it was a major force in developing the Big Red Machine that would go on to win back-to-back World Series in 1975 and 1976, although Menke would be traded back to Houston before then. However, Menke did play in the 1972 World Series for the Reds, that saw them lose to the Oakland A's in seven games.

Coaching career
Menke started his coaching career as a manager in 1977 with the Burlington Bees of the Midwest League, a farm team of the Milwaukee Brewers. The Bees won the League Championship that season in a three-game play-off against the Waterloo Indians. The following year he managed the Dunedin Blue Jays of the Florida State League, with 59 wins and 89 losses. The next year (1979) his record was 68 wins and 69 losses.

For the years 1980 and 1981 he was the first base coach for the Toronto Blue Jays.

Menke returned to the Astros as a hitting coach in 1983 and continued in that position until moving to third base coach in 1986.

In 1989 he joined the Philadelphia Phillies as the hitting coach and continued in that position until 1996.

Menke finished his coaching career returning to the Cincinnati Reds as the bench coach for the years 1997–2000.

Menke died at his home in Tarpon Springs, Florida, on December 1, 2020, at the age of 80.

References

External links
 

Major League Baseball shortstops
Milwaukee Braves players
Atlanta Braves players
Houston Astros players
Cincinnati Reds players
National League All-Stars
Houston Astros coaches
Philadelphia Phillies coaches
Cincinnati Reds coaches
Major League Baseball hitting coaches
Major League Baseball bench coaches
Cedar Rapids Braves players
Midland Braves players
Yakima Braves players
Vancouver Mounties players
Toronto Maple Leafs (International League) players
Baseball players from Iowa
1940 births
2020 deaths
People from Kossuth County, Iowa